The 2012 Stanley Cup playoffs of the National Hockey League (NHL) began on April 11, 2012, after the conclusion of the 2011–12 NHL regular season, and ended on June 11, with the Los Angeles Kings defeating the New Jersey Devils in six games to win their first Stanley Cup title. Kings goaltender Jonathan Quick, having recorded a 1.41 goals against average, was named the Conn Smythe Trophy winner as playoff MVP.

The Vancouver Canucks made the playoffs as the Presidents' Trophy winners for the second consecutive year with the most points (i.e. best record) during the regular season. The Detroit Red Wings increased their postseason appearance streak to twenty-one seasons, the longest active streak at the time. The Florida Panthers returned to the postseason to end a record-breaking 10-season drought from the playoffs that began with the 2000 Stanley Cup playoffs. This was also the first time that the Buffalo Sabres missed the playoffs during their active playoff appearance drought; as of 2022, they have surpassed Edmonton and Florida's shared record for longest playoff appearance drought in league history. This was the first year since 1996 in which no Canadian-based teams advanced past the first round. It marked the first time since 2004 in which none of the previous year's conference finalists (Boston Bruins, Vancouver, Tampa Bay Lightning, and San Jose Sharks) advanced past the opening round.

After clinching a postseason spot in their 81st game of the regular season, the Kings became the first eighth-seeded team to win the Stanley Cup in NHL history (and the second eighth seed to reach the Cup Finals after the 2005–06 Edmonton Oilers). Their postseason began with an elimination of the Vancouver Canucks, who became the third Presidents' Trophy-winning team in the last four seasons to be eliminated in the opening round. Los Angeles went on to become the second team to eliminate the first, second, and third seeds from the playoffs in the same postseason after the 2003–04 Calgary Flames (and the first team to do so in that order). In addition, the Kings became the first team to make the Finals undefeated on the road (with their 8–0 record). As the sixth seed in their conference, the Devils were the lowest-seeded team to have home-ice advantage in the Stanley Cup Finals, breaking a record they set when they won the Cup as a fourth seed in 2000.

Playoff seeds
The top eight teams in each conference qualified for the playoffs. The top three seeds in each conference were awarded to the division winners; while the five remaining spots were awarded to the highest finishers in their respective conferences.

Eastern Conference
New York Rangers, Atlantic Division champions, Eastern Conference regular season champions – 109 points
Boston Bruins, Northeast Division champions – 102 points
Florida Panthers, Southeast Division champions – 94 points
Pittsburgh Penguins – 108 points
Philadelphia Flyers – 103 points
New Jersey Devils – 102 points
Washington Capitals – 92 points (38 )
Ottawa Senators – 92 points (35 )

Western Conference
Vancouver Canucks, Northwest Division champions, Western Conference regular season champions, Presidents' Trophy winners – 111 points
St. Louis Blues, Central Division champions – 109 points
Phoenix Coyotes, Pacific Division champions – 97 points
Nashville Predators – 104 points
Detroit Red Wings – 102 points
Chicago Blackhawks – 101 points
San Jose Sharks – 96 points
Los Angeles Kings – 95 points

Playoff bracket
In each round, the highest remaining seed in each conference was matched against the lowest remaining seed. The higher-seeded team was awarded home ice advantage. In the Stanley Cup Finals, home ice was awarded to the team with the better regular season record. Each best-of-seven series followed a 2–2–1–1–1 format: the higher-seeded team played at home for games one and two (plus five and seven if necessary), and the lower-seeded team was at home for games three and four (and if necessary, game six).

Conference Quarterfinals
The conference quarterfinals featured an NHL-record 16 overtime games.

One of the other major headlines during the conference quarterfinals were the number of suspensions and fines handed by the league. However, several players, coaches and writers complained about the lack of consistency that Brendan Shanahan, the NHL's Vice President of Player Safety and Hockey Operations, was handing out these fines and suspensions. (for each specific fine or suspension, see each series summary below)

Eastern Conference Quarterfinals

(1) New York Rangers vs. (8) Ottawa Senators
The New York Rangers entered the playoffs as the first overall seed in the Eastern Conference with 109 points. The Ottawa Senators earned 92 points during the regular season to finish eighth overall in the Eastern Conference. This was the first playoff series between these two teams. Ottawa won three of the games in the season's four-game regular season series.

The first few games of the series were overshadowed by rough play and suspensions on both sides. In the first game, Rangers' checking center Brian Boyle punched defenceman Erik Karlsson but was not penalized. Senators' head coach Paul MacLean responded by adding enforcers Zenon Konopka and Matt Carkner for game two. Konopka harried Boyle as he conducted a live TV interview during the pre-game warm-ups, earning himself and his club fines. Carkner attacked Boyle at the beginning of the game and continued punching after Boyle fell to the ice. Boyle never dropped his gloves and Carkner was given a five-minute major and game misconduct. The Rangers' Brandon Dubinsky was also ejected as the third man in on the altercation; he threw a Gatorade cooler as he exited. Carkner received a one-game suspension for fighting an unwilling player. In an unrelated incident in that same game, New York's rookie skater Carl Hagelin elbowed Ottawa's captain Daniel Alfredsson in the head. Hagelin was given a five-minute major penalty and Alfredsson left the game and did not return. Hagelin was suspended for three games prompting a question of consistency by the New York Rangers. Alfredsson missed three games due to a concussion from the incident.

New York had a 4–2 victory in game one, but Ottawa's Chris Neil scored 1:17 into overtime of game two to tie the series at 1–1. In game three, Boyle scored the lone goal in the Rangers' 1–0 win. The Senators then overcame a two-goal deficit in game four to even the series yet again with Kyle Turris' goal 2:42 into overtime. Ottawa goaltender Craig Anderson stopped all 41 shots in a 2–0 victory on the road in game five, giving the Senators their first lead in the series. New York scored three goals in the second period in their 3–2 victory in game six and then held on to a 2–1 win in game seven to take the series.

(2) Boston Bruins vs. (7) Washington Capitals
The Boston Bruins, the defending 2011 Stanley Cup champions, entered the playoffs as the second seed in the Eastern Conference by winning the Northeast Division with 102 points. The Washington Capitals earned 92 points during the regular season to finish seventh overall in the Eastern Conference. This was the third playoff series between these two teams, with each team having won one of the previous playoff series. The most recent series between these teams was the 1998 Eastern Conference Quarterfinals, which was won by Washington in six games. Washington won three of the games in this year's four-game regular season series.

This was the first ever playoff series in NHL history in which all seven games were decided by only one goal. In addition, four of these games were decided in overtime. Rookie Capitals goaltender Braden Holtby, who started in place of injured regulars Tomas Vokoun and Michal Neuvirth, allowed only two goals in the first two games, matching his Bruins counterpart Tim Thomas. Thomas recorded a shutout in Boston's 1–0 overtime victory in game one. In game two, the Capitals battled back with a double overtime thriller when forward Nicklas Backstrom scored early in the second overtime period. The Bruins' 4–3 win in game three was followed by Backstrom getting suspended for one game after his post-game cross-check on Bruins forward Rich Peverley. Even without Backstrom, the Capitals evened the series with a 2–1 victory in game four. Washington's Troy Brouwer then scored the winning goal on a power play with 1:27 left in regulation of game five. Boston, facing elimination, went to Washington and managed to extend the series with Tyler Seguin's goal in overtime of game six. Game seven started with Washington forward Matt Hendricks deflecting the puck past Thomas. The Bruins answered with a shot that snuck behind Holtby and Tyler Seguin finding the puck and putting it in, but Washington's Joel Ward scored in overtime to give Washington a 2–1 victory in game seven and eliminate the defending Stanley Cup champion Bruins. With Washington's victory in the series, Holtby became just the third rookie goaltender in NHL history to defeat the reigning Stanley Cup champions.

(3) Florida Panthers vs. (6) New Jersey Devils
The Florida Panthers entered the playoffs as the third seed in the Eastern Conference by winning the Southeast Division with 94 points. The New Jersey Devils earned 102 points during the regular season to finish sixth overall in the Eastern Conference. This was the second playoff series between these two teams, with New Jersey having swept the 2000 Eastern Conference Quarterfinals, the last time the Panthers qualified for the playoffs. The teams split this year's four-game regular season series.

In the first two games of the series, the winner scored the first three goals. In game one, Devils goaltender Martin Brodeur won his 100th career playoff game, only the second netminder after Patrick Roy to do so, as New Jersey won 3–2. The Panthers' 4–2 win in game two was their first playoff win since April 17, 1997, and ended a streak of nine straight defeats in a 15-year span. game three saw both starting goaltenders pulled from the game. Florida's Jose Theodore surrendered three goals in the first period before being replaced by Scott Clemmensen, appearing in only his second playoff game. Brodeur was then pulled after the Panthers rallied to tie the game in the second period en route to 4–3 win. This was the first time since game one of the 2006 Eastern Conference Semifinals against the Carolina Hurricanes that Brodeur was pulled in a postseason game, which coincidentally marked Clemmensen's playoff debut. Brodeur bounced back in game four and broke another one of Roy's records with his 24th career playoff shutout, as the Devils beat the Panthers, 4–0. But Theodore responded with his second career postseason shutout, as the Panthers took a 3–2 series lead with a 3–0 victory in game five. The Devils then tied the series with Travis Zajac's winning goal 5:39 into the overtime of game six. New Jersey's Adam Henrique then scored two goals in game seven, including the series-winning goal 3:47 into double overtime, to defeat Florida, 3–2.

(4) Pittsburgh Penguins vs. (5) Philadelphia Flyers
The Pittsburgh Penguins entered the playoffs as the fourth overall seed in the Eastern Conference with 108 points. The Philadelphia Flyers earned 103 points during the regular season to finish fifth overall in the Eastern Conference. This was the sixth playoff series between these two teams, with Philadelphia having won three of the five previous playoff series. In the most recent matchup in the 2009 Eastern Conference Quarterfinals, the Penguins defeated the Flyers in six games. Philadelphia won four of the games in this year's six-game regular season series. The Penguins entered the series as the favourites, with many hockey commentators predicting them to be the Stanley Cup champions.

However, the Flyers won the first three games of the series en route to eliminating the Penguins in six games. Pittsburgh struggled defensively, giving up eight goals in each of games two and three. The Penguins did however score 10 goals in their game four win, becoming the first team to do so in a playoff game since the Los Angeles Kings scored 12 in the 1990 Smythe Division Semifinals against the Calgary Flames. The Flyers' goaltending flaws resurfaced in that game, with neither Ilya Bryzgalov nor Sergei Bobrovsky able to stop the Penguins' torrid shooting. Again facing elimination, Pittsburgh went on to win game five, 3–2, in the lowest scoring game of the series. But Philadelphia rebounded to eliminate Pittsburgh in game six by the score of 5–1.

Game three was overshadowed by a flurry of penalties drawn between the two teams, reminiscent of their penultimate regular season meeting on April 1. Three Penguins players drew suspensions. Arron Asham was suspended four games for a cross-check on Brayden Schenn, Craig Adams was suspended one game for instigating a fight, and James Neal was suspended one game for charging Claude Giroux. Penguins head coach Dan Bylsma was fined $10,000 because of Adams' instigator penalty in the final five minutes of the game.

The 45 goals scored through the first four games set an NHL record for goals in the first four games of a best-of-seven series. A total of 56 goals were scored over the course of the entire series, the highest total in any playoff series since 1995.

Western Conference Quarterfinals

(1) Vancouver Canucks vs. (8) Los Angeles Kings
The Vancouver Canucks entered the playoffs as the Western Conference regular season champions and Presidents' Trophy winners, earning 111 points. The Los Angeles Kings qualified for the postseason as the eighth seed with 95 points. This was the fifth playoff series between these two teams, the two teams each having won two of the previous playoff series. The most recent matchup occurred in the 2010 Western Conference Quarterfinals, where the Canucks defeated the Kings in six games. The teams split this year's four-game regular season series. The Canucks entered the series as the favourites, with many hockey commentators predicting them to be the Western Conference champions.

However, the Kings won the first three games of the series en route to eliminating the Canucks in five games. In doing so, Los Angeles became the third California team, and the sixth team overall, to eliminate a Presidents' Trophy winner in the first round of the playoffs. Vancouver struggled offensively throughout the series, while Los Angeles goaltender Jonathan Quick only allowed eight total goals, including a shutout in game three. The Canucks' Byron Bitz was suspended for two games after boarding the Kings' Kyle Clifford in game one. Cory Schneider then replaced Roberto Luongo as Vancouver's starting goaltender for game three, prompting speculation that Luongo might be traded after the season. Game four saw the return of Vancouver's Daniel Sedin, in his first appearance since suffering a concussion on March 21. He had an assist in the Canucks' 3–1 victory in game four, and the team avoided becoming the first Presidents' Trophy winner to be swept in a conference quarterfinal series. However, Jarret Stoll ended the Canucks season, scoring at 4:27 of overtime to give the Kings a 2–1 victory in game five, the only overtime game of the series. They moved on to the second round for the first time since 2001.

(2) St. Louis Blues vs. (7) San Jose Sharks
The St. Louis Blues entered the playoffs as the Central Division champions, earning 109 points. The San Jose Sharks qualified for the postseason as the seventh seed with 96 points. This was the fourth playoff series between these two teams, with San Jose having won two of the three previous playoff series. The most recent matchup occurred in the 2004 Western Conference Quarterfinals, where the Sharks defeated the Blues in five games. St. Louis swept this year's four-game regular season series, outscoring San Jose by a combined score of 11–3. A large part of the Blues' success was the play of their goaltenders Jaroslav Halak and Brian Elliott, who both allowed a league low of 165 combined team goals, earning them the William M. Jennings Trophy.

The Blues began the playoffs with Halak on goal, partly based on his playoff experience playing for the Montreal Canadiens. The Sharks took game one off of Martin Havlat's goal in double overtime. Halak then suffered a lower-body injury early into game two, but Elliott picked up where Halak left off in a Blues' 3–0 shutout, and subsequently allowed only five San Jose goals in St. Louis' victories in games three, four, and five to capture the series.

(3) Phoenix Coyotes vs. (6) Chicago Blackhawks
The Phoenix Coyotes entered the playoffs as the third seed in the Western Conference by winning the Pacific Division with 97 points. The Chicago Blackhawks earned 101 points during the regular season to finish sixth overall in the Western Conference. This was the first playoff series between these two teams. Phoenix won three of the games in this year's four-game regular season series.

This became only the second playoff series in NHL history in which the first five games went into overtime, the first being the 1951 Stanley Cup Finals between the Toronto Maple Leafs and the Montreal Canadiens. Games one and two both saw the Blackhawks score the tying goal with less than 15 seconds left in regulation. In game two, Chicago's Andrew Shaw was ejected and later suspended for three games, after hitting Phoenix goaltender Mike Smith in the head. Smith laid on the ice for five minutes but remained in that game. Then in game three, the Coyotes' Raffi Torres hit the Blackhawks' Marian Hossa in the open ice. Hossa was carted out on a stretcher. Torres left his feet, Hossa did not have the puck when Torres hit him, and Torres did not receive a penalty during the game, Torres was later suspended for 25 games and next season's preseason games. The hit violated three rules: interference, charging, and hit to the head. Coyotes forward Mikkel Boedker scored the overtime winning goal in both Game three and four, giving the Coyotes a 3–1 series lead, though Chicago was able to stave off elimination in Game five with a 2–1 overtime win, making it five consecutive games that the two teams required overtime. Game six ended up being one-sided as Smith shutout the Blackhawks, 4–0, and the Coyotes won their first playoff series since moving from Winnipeg to Phoenix in 1996, and the first one in franchise history since 1987.

(4) Nashville Predators vs. (5) Detroit Red Wings
The Nashville Predators entered the playoffs as the fourth overall seed in the Western Conference with 104 points. The Detroit Red Wings earned 102 points during the regular season to finish fifth overall in the Western Conference. This was the third playoff series between these two teams, with Detroit having won both of the previous playoff series in six games, and the most recent matchup occurring in the 2008 Western Conference Quarterfinals. The teams split this year's six-game regular season series.

The Predators defeated the Red Wings in five games, with four of them each being decided by only one goal. In the final seconds of game one, Nashville captain Shea Weber slammed Detroit's Henrik Zetterberg's head into the glass, cracking Zetterberg's helmet. Weber was later fined $2,500 for the action with no suspension or further disciplinary action. Although the Red Wings had the most home wins in the league during the regular season (with an overall home record of 31–7–3), the Predators won both games three and four on the road, Nashville's first-ever playoff victories at Joe Louis Arena.

Conference Semifinals

Eastern Conference Semifinals

(1) New York Rangers vs. (7) Washington Capitals
This was the seventh playoff series between the Rangers and the Capitals, with Washington having won four of the previous six playoff series. This also was the third series between these two teams in the last four seasons, with the previous two series occurring in the 2009 and 2011 Eastern Conference Quarterfinals, which Washington won 4–3 and 4–1, respectively. The teams split this year's four-game regular season series.

New York eliminated Washington in seven games. In game one, the Rangers scored two goals within 1:30 in the third period to take a 3–1 victory. The Capitals then took game two, 3–2, after Alexander Ovechkin scored the game-winning power-play goal with 7:27 left in the third period. Game three then ended at 14:41 of the third overtime with Marian Gaborik's goal to give New York a 2–1 win. This game was the 20th longest overtime game in NHL playoff history, the first 3OT game for the Rangers since 1971, and the longest overtime game in Rangers franchise history since 1939. New York also snapped a streak of seven consecutive playoff overtime losses, their last playoff overtime win coming in 2007. For Washington, it was the third-longest game in franchise history.

Washington evened the series in game four with Mike Green's power play goal with 5:48 remaining to give the Capitals a 2–1 win. In game five, with Washington leading 2–1 with 21.3 seconds remaining, Capitals forward Joel Ward took a double-minor penalty for high-sticking Rangers forward Carl Hagelin, and on the ensuing power play New York forward Brad Richards scored the game-tying goal with 6.6 seconds left in regulation, the latest game-tying playoff goal in Rangers franchise history. The Rangers remained on the power play to start the overtime period, with Ward serving the second half of his double-minor, and Rangers defenceman Marc Staal scored the game-winning goal at 1:35 of OT, completing the comeback. Washington rebounded in game six, winning 2–1 as goaltender Braden Holtby made 30 saves to force game seven. Brad Richards scored 1:32 into the first period to give the Rangers an early 1–0 lead game seven, then Michael Del Zotto scored in the third period to make it 2–0. Washington's Roman Hamrlik cut the score to 2–1 shortly after Del Zotto's goal, but the Capitals were unable to score another goal and lost the series. Through their first 14 games of the playoffs, the Rangers did not allow more than three goals in any of the games, setting an NHL record.

(5) Philadelphia Flyers vs. (6) New Jersey Devils
This was the fifth playoff series between these two teams, with each team having won two of the previous four playoff series. The most recent matchup occurred in the 2010 Eastern Conference Quarterfinals, where the Flyers defeated the Devils in five games. The Atlantic division rivals split this year's six-game regular season series.

The Devils defeated the Flyers in five games. In each game of the series, the team that scored first ended up losing. Daniel Briere scored 4:36 into overtime of game one to give Philadelphia its lone victory of the series by the score of 4–3. New Jersey then scored four third-period goals in a 4–1 victory in game two. Alexei Ponikarovsky's goal 17:21 into overtime defeated the Flyers, 4–3, in game three. Then in game four, the Devils scored four unanswered goals to overcome a 2–0 deficit to win, 4–2. And finally in game five, New Jersey scored two first-period goals 3:18 apart en route to a 3–1 victory to win the series.

Western Conference Semifinals

(2) St. Louis Blues vs. (8) Los Angeles Kings
This was the third playoff series between these two teams, with St. Louis having swept Los Angeles out of both of the previous playoff series; the most recent matchup was in the 1998 Western Conference Quarterfinals. Los Angeles won three of the games in this year's four-game regular season series.

The Kings swept the Blues to advance to their first conference finals since 1993. Los Angeles scored 15 total goals in the series, while goaltender Jonathan Quick only allowed six total St. Louis goals. This series marked the first time in Kings history that they swept a seven-game series, and the first time in NHL history the eighth seed defeated both the first and the second seeds. This was the only sweep of the entire playoffs.

(3) Phoenix Coyotes vs. (4) Nashville Predators
This was the first playoff series between these two teams. The teams split this year's four-game regular season series.

The Coyotes defeated the Predators in five games to advance to their first ever conference finals in team history. This also marked the first time that Phoenix jumped to a 2–0 series lead since 1987. Ray Whitney scored the overtime winner in the Coyotes' 4–3 victory in game one. In game two, four different Phoenix players each had a goal and an assist in their 5–3 win. The Predators bounced back in game three, with goaltender Pekka Rinne stopping all 32 shots in a 2–0 victory. Coyotes goaltender Mike Smith responded with a shutout of his own in game four, stopping 25 shots, while Shane Doan scoring the lone goal in a 1–0 Phoenix win. Smith then continued to hold Nashville scoreless until 14:01 of the third period of game five, and the Coyotes held on to a 2–1 victory to win the series. Nashville was without forwards Alexander Radulov and Andrei Kostitsyn for games three and four, as the team suspended both players for breaking team curfew prior to game three. This marked the last time that the Coyotes won a playoff series until 2020, when they defeated Nashville in the Qualifying Round.

Conference Finals

Eastern Conference Final

(1) New York Rangers vs. (6) New Jersey Devils

This was the sixth playoff series between these two teams, with New Jersey's only win coming from a sweep of the Rangers in the 2006 Eastern Conference Quarterfinals. The Devils and the Rangers last met in the 2008 Eastern Conference Quarterfinals, which the Rangers won in five games. The teams split this year's six-game regular season series. In 1994, the Rangers and the Devils also met in the Eastern Conference Final, with New York prevailing in seven games, en route to winning the 1994 Stanley Cup. The Devils reached the Conference Finals for the first time since beating the Mighty Ducks of Anaheim in the 2003 Stanley Cup Finals, while the Rangers reached the Conference Finals for the first time since 1997, when they lost to rival Philadelphia Flyers.

The Rangers scored three unanswered goals in the third period, and goaltender Henrik Lundqvist stopped all 21 New Jersey shots, to take game one, 3–0. In game two, David Clarkson's score early in the third period broke a 2–2 tie to give the Devils a 3–2 victory. Game three then ended up being similar to game one, as New York scored another three unanswered goals in the third period, and Lundqvist stopped all 37 New Jersey shots, en route to a second 3–0 win in this series. With his fifth goal of the playoffs in game three, Rangers rookie forward Chris Kreider set an NHL record for goals and points (5 goals, 7 points) for a player in the playoffs before his first regular season game.

New Jersey then took game four, 4–1, as Devils goaltender Martin Brodeur made 28 saves and Zach Parise scored two goals. Game five ended up being a wild contest, as New Jersey scored three unanswered goals in the first period before New York tied it up early in the third period. Ryan Carter then scored at 15:36 of the third period, and Zach Parise added an empty-net goal, to give the Devils the 5–3 win. Adam Henrique's goal at 1:03 of overtime of game six then gave New Jersey a 3–2 victory to win the series.

Western Conference Final

(3) Phoenix Coyotes vs. (8) Los Angeles Kings

This was the first playoff series between these two franchises (including when the Coyotes were in Winnipeg). Each team won three games in this year's six-game regular season series. The Kings reached the Conference Finals for the first time since losing in the 1993 Stanley Cup Finals to the Montreal Canadiens, while this marks the first Conference Finals appearance for the Phoenix Coyotes franchise, which made it past the first round of the playoffs for the first time since 1987. Since the NBA's Los Angeles Lakers and Los Angeles Clippers made it to the playoffs, game four of the series had to be played on the same day as game four of the Los Angeles Clippers and San Antonio Spurs series.

The Kings defeated the Coyotes in five games, advancing to their first Cup Finals since 1993. Los Angeles out-shot Phoenix in game one, 48–27, en route to a 4–2 win. The Kings then shut the Coyotes out in game two, 4–0, as goaltender Jonathan Quick made 24 saves and Jeff Carter scored a hat trick. Los Angeles then overcame an early 1–0 deficit to take game three, 2–1. However, Shane Doan scored Phoenix's only two goals, and goaltender Mike Smith stopped all 36 shots, to give the Coyotes a 2–0 victory in game four to extend the series. But Dustin Penner's goal at 17:42 of overtime of game five gave the Kings a 4–3 victory to win the series. The game five win extended the Kings' road playoff winning streak to ten games, eight of which came this season, both setting NHL playoff records. The Kings became only the second team to eliminate the top three seeds from the same postseason, after the 2003–04 Calgary Flames, and the second team in the eighth seed to get to the finals under this playoff format, after the 2005–06 Edmonton Oilers.

Stanley Cup Finals

This was the first playoff series between the Kings and the Devils. The Devils defeated the Kings in both games in this year's two-game regular season series. This was New Jersey's fifth appearance in the Stanley Cup Final, and their first since the  Cup win over Los Angeles's rival Mighty Ducks of Anaheim in seven games. The combined seeds of the teams, 14, is the highest ever for the Stanley Cup Finals. On June 11, 2012, the Los Angeles Kings defeated New Jersey four games to two and won their first championship.

By winning the first two games on the road in Newark, New Jersey, the Los Angeles Kings set the single-season consecutive playoff road winning record at ten. They also improved the record to twelve consecutive road wins going back to the 2011 NHL playoffs when they beat the San Jose Sharks the last two games played in San Jose.

Player statistics

Skaters
These are the top ten skaters based on points. If the list exceeds ten skaters because of a tie in points, goals take precedence, and all the tied skaters are shown.

GP = Games played; G = Goals; A = Assists; Pts = Points; +/– = Plus/minus; PIM = Penalties in minutes

Goaltending
This is a combined table of the top five goaltenders based on goals against average and the top five goaltenders based on save percentage, with at least 420 minutes played. The table is sorted by GAA, and the criteria for inclusion are bolded.

GP = Games played; W = Wins; L = Losses; SA = Shots against; GA = Goals against; GAA = Goals against average; SV% = Save percentage; SO = Shutouts; TOI = Time on ice (minutes:seconds)

Television
National Canadian English-language coverage of the first three rounds of the playoffs were split between CBC and TSN. CBC held exclusive rights to the Finals. French-language telecasts were broadcast on RDS and RDS2.

As part of the NHL's new American TV contract with NBC, this was the first time that all playoffs are aired nationally in the United States on NBC, NBC Sports Network, CNBC, and NHL Network. American regional sports networks still carried their teams' first-round games, but all games from the second round onward were exclusive to one of NBC's networks.

After the completion of the Quarterfinals, the games on the NBC networks garnered the best ever TV rating for NHL games in the United States. The most watched Quarterfinals game ever was game six between Boston and Washington.

References

Playoffs, 2012
Stanley Cup playoffs